Events from the year 1887 in Michigan.

Office holders

State office holders

 Governor of Michigan: Cyrus G. Luce (Republican)
 Lieutenant Governor of Michigan: James H. MacDonald (Republican)
 Michigan Attorney General: Moses Taggart
 Michigan Secretary of State: Gilbert R. Osmun (Republican)
 Speaker of the Michigan House of Representatives: Daniel P. Markey (Republican)
 Chief Justice, Michigan Supreme Court:

Mayors of major cities

 Mayor of Detroit: Marvin H. Chamberlain 
 Mayor of Grand Rapids: Edmund B. Dikeman
 Mayor of Saginaw: Henry M. Youmans (Democratic)

Federal office holders

 U.S. Senator from Michigan: Omar D. Conger/Francis B. Stockbridge (both Republican)
 U.S. Senator from Michigan: Thomas W. Palmer (Republican) 
 House District 1: William C. Maybury/John Logan Chipman (both Democratic)
 House District 2: Nathaniel B. Eldredge (Democratic)/Edward P. Allen (Republican)
 House District 3: James O'Donnell (Republican)
 House District 4: Julius C. Burrows (Republican)
 House District 5: Charles C. Comstock/Melbourne H. Ford (both Democratic)
 House District 6: Edwin B. Winans (Democratic)/Mark S. Brewer (Republican)
 House District 7: Ezra C. Carleton/Justin Rice Whiting (both Democratic)
 House District 8: Timothy E. Tarsney (Democratic)
 House District 9: Byron M. Cutcheon (Republican)
 House District 10: Spencer O. Fisher (Democratic)
 House District 11: Seth C. Moffatt (Republican)

Population

Sports

Baseball

 1887 Detroit Wolverines season – Under manager Bill Watkins, the Wolverines won the 1887 National League pennant, then defeated the St. Louis Browns in the 1887 World Series. It was the first World Series championship for Detroit.the team's statistical leaders included Sam Thompson with a .372 batting average and 166 RBIs, Dan Brouthers with 12 home runs, Ned Hanlon with 69 stolen bases, and Pretzels Getzien with 29 wins. Thompson, Brouthers, and Hanlon have been inducted into the Baseball Hall of Fame.
 1887 Michigan Wolverines baseball season - The Wolverines compiled a 3–4 record. Lincoln MacMillan was the team captain.

American football
 1887 Michigan Wolverines football team – The Wolverines compiled a 5–0 record and outscored their opponents by a total of 102 to 10. The team captain was John L. Duffy.

Chronology of events

January
 January 18 - The two houses of the Michigan Legislature elected Francis B. Stockbridge to represent Michigan in the United States Senate.

February

April
 April 6 - Detroit Athletic Club organized with signing of articles of incorporation by 29 founders.

May

June

July
 July 7 - Michigan Supreme Court decides Sherwood v. Walker

August

November

December
 December 19 - The Detroit Symphony Orchestra performed the first concert of its first subscription season at the Detroit Opera House.

Births
 January 20 - Rebecca Shelley, antiwar activist who attended U-M and lived in Battle Creek, in Pennsylvania
 April 10 - H. G. Salsinger, sports editor of The Detroit News (1909-1958), in Ohio
 May 24 - James K. Watkins, U-M football player and Detroit police commissioner
 June 12 - Pop McKale, coach of football and basketball at Arizona, in Lansing, Michigan
 August 16 - Albert Benbrook, All-American U-M football player, in Texas
 September 15 - Ruth Thompson, represented Michigan in Congress (1951–1957), in Whitehall, Michigan
 September 28 - Avery Brundage, president of the International Olympic Committee (1952-1972), in Detroit
 October 4 - Ray Fisher, U-M baseball coach for 38 years, in Vermont

Gallery of 1887 births

Deaths

 January 2 - John Stoughton Newberry, represented Michigan in Congress (1879-1881), at age 60 in Detroit
 March 3 - Edward Breitung, represented Michigan in Congress (1883-1885), at age 55 in Eastman, Georgia
 May 19 - Charles E. Stuart, represented Michigan in the U.S. Senate (1853-1859), at age 76 in Kalamazoo
 December 16 - John Clough Holmes, founder of what became Michigan State University, at age 78 in Detroit
 December 22 - Seth C. Moffatt, represented Michigan in Congress (1885-1887), at age 46 in Washington, D.C.

Gallery of 1887 deaths

See also
 History of Michigan
 History of Detroit

References